Kaden Hensel and Adam Hubble were the defending champions, but they decided to not participate this year.
Andis Juška and Deniss Pavlovs won the final against Lee Hsin-han and Yang Tsung-hua 7–5, 6–3.

Seeds

Draw

Draw

References
 Doubles Draw

Samarkand Challenger - Doubles
Samarkand Challenger